= Willow Oak, Lexington =

Neighborhood in Lexington, Kentucky

Coordinates: 37.975°N 84.552°W

Willow Oak is a neighborhood in southwestern Lexington, Kentucky, United States. It is a cul de sac community with only one entrance. Its boundary backs up to properties along Boston Road, Millpond Road, Wyndham Hills Drive, and Everetts Dale. Signs were placed on property this week stating no fishing and residents are enforcing the signs.

Neighborhood statistics

- Area: 0.066 square miles (0.17 km^{2})
- Population: 297
- Population density: 4,480 people per square mile
- Median household income: $74,755
